The Royal Australian Air Force (RAAF) has operated numerous ships and other watercraft.

Vessel classifications
RAAF vessel classifications include:
01 - Armoured Target Launch
02 - Rescue Launches
03 - Torpedo Recovery Launch
04 - Refueling Barge
05 - Refueling Barge
06 - Store Vessels, Large Ketches and Lighters
07 - Small Cabin Launch Tender & Ge neral Work Boat
08 - Crash Boat
09 - Aircraft Maintenance Scows
10 - Bomb Scows
11 - Open Hull Work Boat
12 - Whaler
13 - Pulling Dinghy
14 - Sailing Dinghy
15 - Requisitioned Vessels, Cargo Vessels and Bomb Scows
16 - Supply Craft
17 - Work Boat for General Duties
18 - Powered Landing Barge
19 - Small Lighter with a loading Derrick/Dumb Barge
20 - Fire Boat
21 - Refrigerator Freezer Barge

Former vessels
Former vessels of the RAAF include:



A
Air Mercy (925)

B
06.9 Betty Joan (ketch)

E
06.10 Ena (schooner)

M
08.3 Mary Ann

T
06.14 The Ruptured Duck (steel supply ship)

U
015.09 Una V

W
SS Wanaka (requisitioned supply ship)
06.10 Schooner Waimana (schooner)

Y
06.11 Yalata (ketch)

References

Air Force
Royal Australian Air Force lists
Ships of Australia